The statocyst is a balance sensory receptor present in some aquatic invertebrates, including bivalves, cnidarians, ctenophorans, echinoderms, cephalopods, and crustaceans. A similar structure is also found in Xenoturbella. The statocyst consists of a sac-like structure containing a mineralised mass (statolith) and numerous innervated sensory hairs (setae). The statolith's inertia causes it to push against the setae when the animal accelerates.  Deflection of setae by the statolith in response to gravity activates neurons, providing feedback to the animal on change in orientation and allowing balance to be maintained.

In other words, the statolith shifts as the animal moves. Any movement large enough to throw the organism off balance causes the statolith to brush against tiny bristles which in turn send a message to the brain to correct its balance.

It may have been present in the common ancestor of cnidarians and bilaterians.

Hearing

In cephalopods like squids, statocysts provide a cochlea-like mechanism to hear. As a result, the longfin inshore squid for instance can hear low-frequency sounds between 30 and 500 Hz when the water temperature is above 8 °C.

See also
Accelerometer
Inertial guidance
Müllerian vesicle, similar structure in loxodid ciliates
Otolith, an equivalent structure in vertebrates.
Statocyte, a similar structure in plants
Sensory organs of gastropods

References

Vestibular system
Cnidarian anatomy
Arthropod anatomy
Mollusc anatomy